Elm Grove Township is a township in Louisa County, Iowa.

History
Elm Grove Township was organized in 1857.

References

Townships in Louisa County, Iowa
1857 establishments in Iowa
Populated places established in 1857
Townships in Iowa